Pałapus – village in Poland, Masovian voivodeship, Ostrów Mazowiecka County, in Gmina Ostrów Mazowiecka.

Place was created 1 January 2013 from a combination of villages Pałapus Szlachecki and Pałapus Włościański.

References 

Villages in Ostrów Mazowiecka County